Archie Virgil Ware (June 19, 1918 – December 13, 1990) was an American first baseman in Negro league baseball. He played between 1942 and 1952.

In between, Ware played winter ball in Venezuela with the Navegantes del Magallanes club in the 1947–48 season, and for the Spur Cola Colonites of Panama in 1950–51, playing for Spur Cola in the 1951 Caribbean Series.

Sources

External links
 and Seamheads
The Forgotten Championship. Cleveland Magazine. May 2006 issue.

1918 births
1990 deaths
African-American baseball players
Cincinnati/Cleveland Buckeyes players
Cleveland Buckeyes players
Farnham Pirates players
Lewiston Broncs players
Navegantes del Magallanes players
American expatriate baseball players in Venezuela
People from Greenville, Florida
20th-century African-American sportspeople